Oreoseris is a genus of flowering plants in the family Asteraceae, native to Anatolia, Central Asia, the Himalaya region, and Thailand. Originally described in 1838, it was resurrected with the Asian species of Gerbera and all the species of Uechtritzia in 2018.

Species
The following species are accepted:
Oreoseris armena 
Oreoseris delavayi 
Oreoseris gossypina 
Oreoseris henryi 
Oreoseris kokanica 
Oreoseris lacei 
Oreoseris latiligulata 
Oreoseris maxima 
Oreoseris nivea 
Oreoseris raphanifolia 
Oreoseris rupicola 
Oreoseris tanantii

References

Asteraceae genera
Mutisieae